Beatriz Martín (born 24 September 1974) is a Spanish judoka. She competed in the women's heavyweight event at the 2000 Summer Olympics.

References

1974 births
Living people
Spanish female judoka
Olympic judoka of Spain
Judoka at the 2000 Summer Olympics
Sportspeople from Madrid
Mediterranean Games bronze medalists for Spain
Mediterranean Games medalists in judo
Competitors at the 1997 Mediterranean Games
20th-century Spanish women
21st-century Spanish women